Vignette may refer to:

 Vignette (entertainment), a sketch in a sketch comedy
 Vignette (graphic design), decorative designs in books (originally in the form of leaves and vines) to separate sections or chapters
 Vignette (literature), short, impressionistic scenes that focus on one moment or give a particular insight into a character, idea, or setting
 Vignette (model), a form of diorama
 Vignette (philately), the central part of a stamp design
 Vignette (professional wrestling), a video package used to promote wrestling characters or storylines
 Vignette (psychology), a short description of an event, behavior or person used in a psychology experiment to control information provided to participants
 Vignette (road tax), a small, colored sticker affixed to motor vehicles in some European nations to indicate road tolls have been paid
 Vignette (vineyard), in viticulture, part of a larger consolidated vineyard
 Vignette Corporation, a Texas-based commercial software company
 Vignettes (Marilyn Crispell album), 2007
 Vignettes (Ray Drummond album), 1995
 Vignetting in photography, any process by which there is loss in clarity towards the corners and sides of an image